Minnesota Centennial Showboat was a traditional riverboat theatre docked at Harriet Island Regional Park on the banks of the Mississippi River in downtown Saint Paul, Minnesota, United States.  The showboat contained an intimate jewelbox theatre that seated 225.  The interior was decorated to keep in time with the Victorian Era style commonly associated with showboats.  The Minnesota Centennial Showboat was run through a partnership with the University of Minnesota Theatre Department and the Padelford Boat Company.  The showboat was a longtime tradition with the University beginning in 1958.  The University Theatre utilized the showboat as a learning opportunity for its students to experience professional theatre. The showboat had its final performance in 2016.

History 
In 1956, the Minnesota Centennial Commission began to plan for the 1958 state centennial celebration. Frank Whiting, director of the University of Minnesota's theater program, saw an opportunity to realize his dream of a showboat theater on the Mississippi River. He proposed a Minnesota Centennial Showboat. The commission agreed, and the search began for a suitable boat.

Finding a paddleboat wasn't easy, and building one on an existing barge proved too costly. In 1957, Whiting and the Centennial Commission's Tom Swain learned that the U.S. Army Corps of Engineers planned to retire the General John Newton, a  sternwheeler towboat built in 1899. Minnesota Senator Edward J. Thye helped to arrange its transfer to the university for the symbolic fee of one dollar.

The paddleboat arrived in Saint Paul on April 3, 1958. The university had less than three months to prepare it for the season opening on June 26. Students helped to recreate the atmosphere of an 1890s showboat by painting walls, sewing curtains, reupholstering old theater seats, building scenery, and sewing costumes.

The first season opened with a production of Augustin Daly's 1867 melodrama Under the Gaslight. Miss Minnesota Diane Albers, assisted by Doc Whiting and Centennial Commission Chairman Peter Popovich, christened the boat by breaking a bottle of champagne across the bow. James S. Lombard of the commission's arts committee cut the ribbon to open the gangplank. Mayor Joseph E. Dillon of Saint Paul rang the ship's original bell to invite the theater's first patrons aboard.

In its early years, the showboat traveled up and down the river. It stopped for scheduled performances in Minneapolis, Saint Paul, Stillwater, Hastings, Red Wing, Wabasha, and Winona. The student cast, numbering about fifteen, performed one or two plays each season. Each show featured vaudeville-style olios (lively song-and-dance numbers) between acts. In addition to performing, the actors cleaned the boat, greeted visitors, and took tickets, among other tasks.

1969 marked the last season the boat toured. Following that season, it made an appearance in the Swedish film The Emigrants before settling into a stationary mooring site on the river's east bank, below Coffman Memorial Union.

In 1995, the ninety-six-year-old paddleboat moved to Saint Paul for $2 million in needed repairs. However sparks from a welder ignited a fire that destroyed the boat on the evening of January 27, 2000, just months before its scheduled reopening. Only the paddlewheel and burned-out hull remained.

University theater professor C. Lance Brockman led a campaign to obtain a new showboat. In December 2000, the university agreed to a partnership with the City of Saint Paul, the Saint Paul Riverfront Development Corporation, and the Padelford Packet Boat Company to build a new showboat. Construction began the following spring in Greenville, Mississippi.

Christened the Frank M. Whiting, the new Minnesota Centennial Showboat arrived at Harriet Island on April 17, 2002. It opened on July 4 with a production of Dr. Jekyll and Mr. Hyde.

The Minnesota Centennial Showboat exposed students to a unique type of theater. Student actors embraced the over-the-top style of melodrama. Designers and student crews met the challenges presented by a small performance space. Audiences joined the fun by booing and hissing at the villain and applauding the hero.

The showboat program earned the Tourism Partner of the Year Award from the Saint Paul Convention and Visitors Bureau in 2004. The Padelford Packet Boat Company joined the university's Department of Theatre Arts & Dance to create the C. Lance Brockman Showboat Scholarship later that year.

The final curtain came down on the Minnesota Centennial Showboat at the end of the 2016 summer season. The university's fifteen-year agreement with the City of Saint Paul expired, and the university cut the program for budget reasons. The final season featured a revival of Under the Gaslight.

The university sold the boat to the City of Saint Paul for one dollar. As of 2018, future plans for the showboat are pending a new management agreement.

In 2018, a nonprofit raised money to buy the boat and move it to Winona, Minnesota.

The Showboat Players
The Showboat Players were a troupe of performers that were cast exclusively from students at the University of Minnesota.  They performed a wide range of melodramas and comedies, plays most commonly viewed by 19th century audiences.  The Showboat Players are most known for their whimsical olios. Many well-known performers today received their first taste of professional theatre as a Showboat Player; Loni Anderson, Linda Kelsey, Peter MacNicol, Peter Michael Goetz, and Jon Cranney to name a few.

Olios
Olios are musical entertainment pieces performed either between scenes or as an afterpiece to relieve the tension created by the melodrama and its serious storyline.  University of Minnesota Professor Robert Darrell Moulton, who created many of the olios performed, found it important to have the olios be in contrast to the play, but be in tune with it stylistically and thematically.  The olios mainly depend on the performers' strengths; they may also use a clever "gimmick" or surprise.  It is essential in an olio to present romance, nostalgia, color, extravagance, and affectionate fun.  Olios have been a favorite among the Showboat audiences, and this was mainly due in part to Bob Moulton drawing upon his talents as a dancer, costumer, choreographer, and director.

Shows performed on the showboat
  1958: Under the Gaslight
  1959: Billy the Kid and She Stoops to Conquer
  1960: Forty-Five Minutes From Broadway
  1961: Bloomer Girl
  1962: Rip van Winkle and The Merry Wives of Windsor
  1963: Camille and Under the Gaslight
  1964: A Midsummer Night's Dream and Zoey, or Life in Louisiana
  1965: Because I Love You and Arms and the Man
  1966: The Great Git-Away and Fashion
  1967: Romeo and Juliet and Charley's Aunt
  1968: The Rivals and Trelawny of the "Wells" 
  1969: The School for Scandal and The Birds
  1970: Lady of Lyons and Tartuffe
  1971: The Matchmaker and The Devil's Disciple
  1972: Show Boat and The Madwoman of Chaillot
  1973: A Midsummer Night's Dream and Stephen Foster
  1974: The Importance of Being Earnest and The Tavern and Trial By Jury
  1975: An Ideal Husband and The Magistrate
  1976: The Streets of New York
  1977: The Black Crook
  1978: Dracula
  1979: Dandy Dick
  1980: Charley's Aunt
  1981: Hazel Kirke
  1982: The Belle of New York
  1983: Florodora
  1984: The Count of Monte Cristo
  1985: The Girl of Golden West
  1986: Sherlock Holmes
  1987: The Bat
  1988: Down River Ramble: A Mississippi Panorama
  1989: Captain Jinks of the Horse Marines
  1990: The Moonstone 
  1991: Dracula
  1992: Angel Street and The Mystery of Irma Vep
  1993: The Mousetrap
  1994: Charley's Aunt
  1995: Peg O' My Heart
  1996: The Matchmaker
  2002: Dr. Jekyll and Mr. Hyde
  2003: Dracula
  2004: The Mousetrap
  2005: Importance of Being Earnest
  2006: Forty-Five Minutes from Broadway
  2007: Sherlock's Last Case
  2008: Count of Monte Cristo
  2009: Is There a Doctor in the House?
  2010: Triumph of Love
  2011: The Demon Barber of Fleet Street: The Melodrama of Sweeney Todd
  2012: The Vampire!
  2013: Sweet Revenge!
  2014: Dr. Jekyll and Mr. Hyde
  2016: Under the Gaslight

References

 Minnesota Centennial Showboat Web site
 C. Lance Brockman.  The New Minnesota Centennial Showboat: Something Old, Something New, Something Borrowed and Something Red, White and Blue. Vol. 38 No. 4 (Fall 2002): 38
University of Minnesota Department of Theatre Arts and Dance.  Minnesota Centennial Showboat 2002 Commemorative Program.
Rachel Smoka.  Minnesota Centennial Showboat: A Historical Journey.

Culture of Saint Paul, Minnesota
Former theatres in the United States
Paddle steamers of the United States
Theatres in Minnesota
Tourist attractions in Saint Paul, Minnesota
University of Minnesota